Anthony Martin Fernando (6 April 1864 – 9 January 1949) was an early Aboriginal Australian toymaker and early political activist.

Biography
Fernando was born in Woolloomooloo, New South Wales as a member of the Dharug nation. He spent most of his life in "self-imposed" exile, overseas, protesting and publicising the injustices inflicted upon himself, his people, and Aboriginal Australians generally:

...'his long grey beard damp with mist, his frail elderly frame wrapped in a large overcoat'. Pinned to his coat were scores of small, white, toy skeletons and he wore a placard proclaiming: 'This is all Australia has left of my people'

He died in the East London town of Ilford on 9 January 1949.

On-line newspaper articles
 
 
 
 Steve Meacham, "Aboriginal activist campaigned in Europe 100 years ago", Sydney Morning Herald, May 27, 2012.

External links
 Browning, Daniel (15 July 2007) "Fernando's Ghost", Hindsight, ABC Radio NationalAccessed 30 May 2010.
 "Fernando's Ghost" - Transcript, SOVEREIGN UNION - National Unity Government, "Sovereign Union" - Asserting Aboriginal Sovereignty into Governance.
 Goodall, Heather (1988) "Aboriginal Calls for Justice: Learning from History" Aboriginal Law Bulletin No. 37 Accessed 30 May 2010.
 National Museum of Australia "From Little Things Big Things Grow: Fighting for Indigenous Rights 1920–1970" Exhibition – including artist's impression of Anthony Martin Fernando Accessed 30 May 2010.
 Paisley, Fiona "Into self-imposed exile" Griffith REVIEW Edition 6: Our Global Face Accessed 30 May 2010.
 Paisley, Fiona "Hidden Story Behind a Portrait (of Anthony Martin Fernando)" National Museum of AustraliaAccessed 30 May 2010.
 THE STORY OF AM FERNANDO, Radio National, Late Night Live, 23 May 2012.

Further reading
 Fiona Paisley, The Lone Protestor - A M Fernando in Australia and Europe.  Aboriginal Studies Press, 2012.

References

1864 births
1949 deaths
Australian indigenous rights activists
People from Sydney